Johannes Sticheler or Johannes Stickels is a 15th-century composer known primarily from his  in Vienna, Nationalbibliothek, MS 1 1883. He is possibly the same composer as Jonnes Estiche, known for an Ave Maris Stella and a motet or mass section Et incarnatus est.

References

Austrian composers
Renaissance composers
15th-century composers